The Gorge is a collection of the songs played during Dave Matthews Band's three-night concert in 2002 at The Gorge Amphitheatre in George, Washington. The album was released in a three-disc set featuring 2 CDs and a DVD with live footage, advanced multi-angle features, behind the scenes clips, and a music video. The DVD was directed by Fenton Williams of Filament Productions. The DVD was authored by Neil Matthews at Ascent Media in New York City. The entire three-night concert was also released online through the band's online store as an MP3 or FLAC download, or as a six-CD box set.

Track listing
All songs by David J. Matthews, except where noted.

Disc one
 "Pantala Naga Pampa" » "Rapunzel" – 7:50
 "The Song That Jane Likes" (David Matthews, Mark Roebuck) - 4:33
 "Fool to Think" – 4:19
 "You Never Know" – 7:13
 "Granny" – 4:08
 "Gravedigger" – 5:18
 "Everyday" » #36" – 8:47
 "Two Step" – 19:01
Disc two
 "Drive In, Drive Out" – 6:14
 "The Space Between" – 4:55
 "Kit Kat Jam" – 5:27
 "Lie In Our Graves" – 16:59
 "Proudest Monkey" – 8:49
 "Warehouse" 8:56

Disc (DVD)
 "Grey Street"
 "Ants Marching"
 Inside the Gorge (documentary)
 "Pig"
 "Dancing Nancies"
 "What Would You Say"
 "Loving Wings" » "Where Are You Going"
 Inside the Gorge (featuring "Gravedigger")
 "Seek Up"
 "Halloween"
 "Tripping Billies"
 Inside the Gorge (Making the "Grace Is Gone" video)
 "Grace Is Gone" (Music video)

Special edition
The six-disc special edition features each song from all three nights. This release was only available from Musictoday.com's online store and was not sold in stores.

Disc one – September 6, 2002
 "Don't Drink the Water" – 10:43
 "When the World Ends" – 4:08
 "You Never Know" – 7:20
 "Grace Is Gone" – 6:57
 "#41" – 14:07
 "Satellite" – 5:29
 "Bartender" – 13:42
 "So Much to Say" » – 4:16
 "Anyone Seen the Bridge?" » – 1:23
 "Too Much" – 4:35

Disc two – September 6, 2002
"Fool to Think" – 4:56
 "One Sweet World" – 9:18
 "Loving Wings" – 7:04
 "Where Are You Going" – 3:57
 "Everyday" » "#36" – 8:59
 "Grey Street" – 6:31
 "Gravedigger" – 5:49
 "Ants Marching" – 7:43

Disc three – September 7, 2002
"Grace Is Gone" – 7:50
 "The Stone" – 8:35
 "Pig" – 8:29
 "Rhyme and Reason" – 6:03
 "Captain" – 5:48
 "I Did It" – 3:41
 "Dancing Nancies" – 9:48
 "Warehouse" – 8:51
 "What Would You Say" – 5:28
 "Crush" – 11:55

Disc four – September 7, 2002
"Kit Kat Jam" – 5:55
 "Jimi Thing" – 15:24
 "Drive In, Drive Out" – 6:19
 "Loving Wings" – 7:12
 "Where Are You Going" – 4:23
"Two Step" – 20:03
 "Cry Freedom" – 4:39
 "What You Are" – 8:33

Disc five – September 8, 2002
"Pantala Naga Pampa" » "Rapunzel" – 8:46
 "Grey Street" – 5:53
 "Granny" – 4:36
 "If I Had It All" – 4:24
 "Crash into Me" – 5:55
 "The Song That Jane Likes" – 4:33
 "The Space Between" – 4:53
 "Seek Up" – 20:59
 "Proudest Monkey" – 9:16
 "Too Much" – 5:13
 "Digging a Ditch" – 5:19

Disc six – September 8, 2002
"Lie in Our Graves" – 18:37
 "Lover Lay Down" – 8:27
 "Grace Is Gone" – 7:12
 "The Dreaming Tree" – 4:28
 "All Along the Watchtower" – 12:09
 "Long Black Veil" – 5:55
 "Halloween" – 9:06
 "Tripping Billies" – 6:20

Personnel
Dave Matthews Band
Carter Beauford – percussion, drums, backup vocals
Stefan Lessard – bass guitar
Dave Matthews – acoustic guitar (electric guitar on "What You Are"), vocals
LeRoi Moore – saxophones, backup vocals
Boyd Tinsley – electric violin, backup vocals

Additional musicians
Butch Taylor – keyboards

Technical personnel

Gary Adcock -  screen graphics: tour
Dave Bell -  production assistant
Michael Caron -  stadium video: tour
Mo Hale -  stage manager: tour
Jim Hathaway -  tour security
Patrick Jordan -  project manager
Felix Kawamura -  opening title designer
Thane Kerner -  package art director
Thane Kerner -  package designer
Mike Lane -  engineer
Dean Lawrence -  tour manager
Malan McCubbin -  engineer in charge (as Malin MacCubin)
Andrew McHaddad -  communications
Ken McMillan -  production assistant
Anthony Miller -  head utility
Chris Mitchell -  engineer in charge
Terry O'Gara -  production assistant
Jonathan O'Keefe -  merchandiser: tour
Erik Porter -  violin/bass technician: tour
David Richard -  production assistant
David Saull -  horn technician: tour
Greg Tannebring -  assistant communications
Geoffrey Trump -  tour accountant
Adam Warner -  production assistant
Angie Warner -  backstage coordinator: tour
Fenton Williams -  video director: tour

References

Albums produced by John Alagía
Dave Matthews Band live albums
Dave Matthews Band video albums
2004 live albums
RCA Records live albums
RCA Records video albums
Live video albums